Alessandro Pio Riccio (born 6 February 2002) is an Italian footballer who plays for  Juventus Next Gen.

Career 
Riccio started playing football at Sport Village, in Qualiano. In 2016, Riccio moved to Juventus. In the 2016–17 season, Riccio won the league with the under-15s. On 28 October 2020, Andrea Pirlo called up Riccio for a match against Barcelona. On 15 September 2021, Riccio made his debut for Juventus U23 in a 3–2 Coppa Italia Serie C win against Feralpisalò. On 31 October, during a match against Südtirol, he injured his zygomatic bone. His first match after this injury came on 18 December, in a 2–1 win against Legnago. On 17 February 2022, Riccio scored his first goal in his career with an header from a corner kick in a match eventually won 4–0 against Piacenza. On 29 April, he extended his contract at Juventus until 2024.

International career 
Riccio represented Italy internationally at under-15, under-16, under-17, under-18. He was called up the 2019 UEFA European Under-17 Championship losing 4–2 the final against Netherlands. He was also called up for the 2019 FIFA U-17 World Cup, where Italy were eliminated against Brazil in the quarter-finals.

Honours 
 UEFA European Under-17 Championship runner-up: 2019

Career statistics

Club

Notelist

References 

Living people
2002 births
Juventus F.C. players
Juventus Next Gen players
Italian footballers
Association football defenders
Footballers from Naples